Mount Sod is a mountain in Dukes County, Massachusetts. It is east of Monsod Bay on Nonamesset Island.

References

Mountains of Massachusetts
Mountains of Dukes County, Massachusetts